Afro-Palestinians are Palestinians of Black African heritage. A minority of Afro-Palestinians which number around 350-450 reside in an African enclave around the Bab al-Majlis, in the Muslim Quarter of Jerusalem. Some of the community dwell in other areas of Jerusalem such as Beit Hanina and A-Tur. 

There are also Bedouin Palestinians outside Jerusalem who have descent lines linking them to people of African origin such as in the West Bank of Jericho and Gaza.

History

Background
By the 9th century, it is estimated that some 3 million Africans had been resettled as enslaved people in the Middle East, working as soldiers and labourers in the riverine plantation economies. As is illustrated by the life of Mansa Musa king of the medieval kingdom of Mali, pilgrimage by African converts to Islam became an established practice, though regular pilgrimage only became commonplace in the 15th century, as the Islamic faith spread beyond the narrow confines of sultanate courts to the people at large. There are some Palestinian communities which trace their origins to pilgrims from Sudan and Central Africa (mainly Chad) who are said to have reached Palestine as early as the 12th century. Their initial aim was to take part in the Hajj and reach Mecca, after which they visited Jerusalem to visit the al-Aqsa Mosque. Many Afro-Palestinians also hail from forefathers who came to Palestine enslaved in service to the Ottomans.

People whose ancestors came from Nigeria, Sudan, Senegal and Chad make up most of the community, and most of these came to Palestine during the British Mandate. Many, according to Abraham Milligram, came as conscripted labourers during General Edmund Allenby's campaign against the Turks in the latter stages of WW1. Another group trace their lineage to the Arab Salvation Army who fought on the Arab side of the 1948 Arab–Israeli War.

The Jerusalem community of Afro-Palestinians, 50 families now numbering some 350 (or 450) members, reside in two compounds outside the Ḥaram ash-Sharīf (west of the Inspector's Gate): Ribat al-Mansuri and Ribat of Aladdin (Ribat al-Baseri/Ribat Aladdin al-Bassir/Ribat Al'a ad-Deen Busari). They were built between 1267 and 1382 and served as ribats (hostels for visiting Muslim pilgrims) under the Mamluks. This distinctive enclave has been called Jerusalem's Little Harlem. During the Arab Revolt of WW1, the Ottomans converted the compounds into jails – one known as 'the Blood Prison' and the other as 'the hanging prison' – where prisoners were detained and executed. The community has restructured part of this former prison to create a mosque. Until the Israeli occupation that began in 1967, they were employed as guards at the Ḥaram ash-Sharīf, a function now taken over by Israeli soldiers.

These have close links with similar communities in Acre and Jericho, established when Africans came to work in the Umayyad sugar industry.  The community in northern Jericho have often been called "the slaves of Duyuk" even in modern times.

Modern times
Following Ottoman rule, the ribats became a part of the religious trust (waqf). The Palestinian leader and mufti of Jerusalem Sheikh Amin al-Husseini rented out these compounds to Palestinians of African background, in gratitude for their loyalty as protectors of the al-Aqsa Mosque after one of the African guards, Jibril Tahruri, took a bullet aimed at the mufti. The rent remains largely nominal. Afro-Palestinians whose connection to Jerusalem predates 1947 found themselves in one of the most troubled areas in the region. Falling in love with the city of Jerusalem and with deep ties to Islam, they married Palestinians and continue to identify as Palestinians. After 1948, in particular, black Palestinian men married women coming from the peasant fellahin society, but never Bedouin women.

The African Palestinians who now live in the two compounds near al-Aqsa mosque have called the area home since 1930. They have experienced prejudice, with some Palestinian Arabs referring to them as 'slaves' (abeed) and to their neighbourhood as the 'slaves' prison' (habs al-abeed), and their colour has led to objections against them marrying Palestinians with lighter skin. According to Mousa Qous, director of the African Community Society and a former member of the PFLP, "Sometimes when a black Palestinian wants to marry a white Palestinian woman, some members of her family might object." Interracial marriage with Afro-Palestinians has become more common in recent years. In colloquial Palestinian Arabic, standard usage prefers the word sumr (black colour) over sawd, which has an uncouth connotation.

By contrast, Ali Jiddah, a tour guide and also a former member of the PFLP, has stated he personally never experienced prejudice over his skin colour from Palestinian Arabs, claiming Afro-Palestinians enjoy a special status for their contributions to the Palestinian struggle. Fatima Barnawi, of mixed Nigerian-Palestinian descent, was the first Palestinian woman to be arrested on terrorism charges for attempting to bomb a movie theater in downtown Jerusalem in 1967. Although the bomb failed to explode, she was sentenced to 30 years in prison, ultimately serving only ten. Jiddah placed four grenades on Strauss Street in a 1968 attack in downtown Jerusalem, wounding nine Israeli civilians. His cousin Mahmoud likewise committed a similar attack. Both men served 17 years in prison before being released in a prisoner swap in 1985. According to Jiddah, any racism by Palestinian Arabs could be blamed on ignorance, claiming he had experienced similar prejudice from Israelis. "We Afro-Palestinians are dually oppressed, as Palestinians and because of our color the Israelis call us 'kushis.'" According to Mahmoud, Israeli police are the main perpetrators of racism against the community. In 2022, Mohammed Firawi was released from prison after five years for allegedly throwing stones at Israeli police. The community celebrated his return to the African Quarter, which was cited as cause for his subsequent re-arrest and week-long expulsion from Jerusalem.

The African Community Society (ACS) was established in 1983 as an off-shoot of the former Sudanese Welfare Club, which disbanded following Israeli annexation of East Jerusalem. ACS organizes social activities, sports, mutual aid, and other means to empower Afro-Palestinians in Jerusalem.

See also
Jericho, with a substantial population of black Palestinians
Beta Israel

Notes

Citations

African diaspora in the Arab world
African diaspora in the Middle East
Palestinian people of African descent
Ethnic groups in the State of Palestine
African diaspora in Asia